Post-traumatic is an American novel first published in 2022 by Little, Brown and Company. The novel marked the debut of author Chantal V. Johnson. The novel follows an outwardly successful lawyer working at a psychiatric hospital who struggles with hypocritical thoughts and an eating disorder after experiencing sexual violence. Johnson wrote the novel while working full time as a lawyer. Upon its release, the book received mixed reviews.

Summary
Vivian is an outwardly successful seeming woman in her 30s who lives in New York City and has a job as a lawyer advocating for mentally ill patients who have been institutionalised. In private Vivian is struggling with being sexually assaulted as a child which has manifested itself in fear that she will be assaulted again and an eating disorder.

Semi-estranged from her abusive family, Vivian focuses on dating, hoping to find a boyfriend who she will be able to create a new family with. Online dating she meets Matthew, a handsome man who seems enamoured of her, and focuses on turning herself into the perfect woman he would find attractive.

After attending a family reunion with her family where Vivian is hit on by a cousin and witnesses her brother verbally abuse her nephew, Vivian contemplates cutting off her entire family. She tries to bring up the subject with friends who dismiss her desire for estrangement and the situation with her cousin. Vivian nevertheless decides to estrange herself from her family.

After failing to free a teenage patient from the psychiatry ward she has been confined to Vivian abruptly quits her job to focus on writing. She also becomes fixated on Elliot, the husband of Pauline, a woman who had similar life circumstances to Vivian but grew up in a more functional family.

At a mutual friend's wedding Vivian tries to kiss Elliot who rebuffs her and then snaps, revealing Pauline's eating disorder to the entire bridal party and throwing a drink at her. Returning home police perform a wellness check on her at the behest of her brother. Upset, Vivian decides to seek therapy.

In therapy Vivian works through her issues with her family and her unhealthy fixation with men. She reunites with her best friend Jane and works towards completing her novel.

Reception
Post-Traumatic received mixed reviews. Vulture called Johnson's writing "witty and maximalist". Publishers Weekly described the book as "revelatory and powerful" and gave the book a starred review, whereas Kirkus generally complimented the thoughtfulness and opening, but critiqued it as occasionally verbose. Reviewing for The New York Times, Dalia Azim also described the book as an "emotionally complex debut". A Booklist  review was more critical, stating the prose "hurried along" and the novel as overall uneven.

References 

2022 American novels
2022 debut novels
Little, Brown and Company books
Novels set in New York City